Kaili Vernoff is an American actress.  While she has many television and film credits, she is perhaps best known for her multiple collaborations with Woody Allen.

Biography

Kaili Vernoff was born in Los Angeles, California and lived in many cities as a child, including Park City, Utah and Troy, New York. She attended Boston University where she received a BFA in acting. She moved to New York City upon graduation, where she has lived and worked ever since. Her first feature was the Ed Burns' film, No Looking Back (1998), in which she played "Alice". Soon after that, she worked with Woody Allen for the first time in his film Celebrity (1998), and she ended up on "the cutting room floor". Allen cast her in his next feature, the Academy Award nominated Sweet and Lowdown, in which she played the role of "Gracie" opposite Samantha Morton and Sean Penn. She has appeared in six Woody Allen projects in total, most recently in his first foray into television, the Amazon series, Crisis in Six Scenes. She has worked steadily in film, television, and theater. Other notable roles include "Kerry Ridge" in the Hulu drama The Path (2016–2017) and "Karen" in the film Thoroughbreds, had its world premiere at the Sundance Film Festival in January 2017. Vernoff played a supporting role in the 2018 video game Red Dead Redemption 2 as Susan Grimshaw. Performance capture for the role took place on and off for five years prior to the game's release.

Filmography

Film

Television

Video games

References

External links
 
 Divorce: The Greatest Hits — Short Film Shows Absurdity of Breakups
 Kaili Vernoff Finds ‘The Way’; Scott Porter Joins ‘Outcast’
 Sundance Film Festival Unveils 2017 Competition, Next Lineups
 Sundance 2017: Hulk Hogan Trial, Anton Yelchin & Ferguson Unrest Among Pics On U.S., World Cinema & NEXT Slates
 Sundance Film Festival Announces First Wave of 2017 Films
 Susan Grimshaw's Actress Describes Four Years Of 'Red Dead Redemption 2'
 Sisterhood, shotguns and slapping: Red Dead Redemption 2's cast talk around the virtual campfire

20th-century American actresses
21st-century American actresses
American film actresses
American television actresses
American voice actresses
Living people
People from Los Angeles
Year of birth missing (living people)